Ball Court/Plaza Sites of Puerto Rico and the U.S. Virgin Islands are the subject of a Multiple Property Submission to the National Register of Historic Places (NRHP) in the U.S. territories of Puerto Rico and the Virgin Islands. The submission consists of 56 archaeological sites containing bateyes (53 sites in Puerto Rico and 3 sites on the island of St. Croix), out of which five have been inscribed in the NRHP.

List of ball court/plaza sites 
The following list includes all known ball court sites in the United States territories in the Caribbean as identified by the State Historic Preservation Offices (SHPOs) of the Commonwealth of Puerto Rico and the Territory of the U.S. Virgin Islands, documented and surveyed by the National Register Programs Division with the Southeast Regional Office of the National Park Service.

See also 
 Taino archaeology

References 

National Historic Landmarks in Puerto Rico
Archaeological sites on the National Register of Historic Places in Puerto Rico
National Historic Landmarks in the United States Virgin Islands
National Register of Historic Places Multiple Property Submissions
Properties of religious function on the National Register of Historic Places in Puerto Rico
Properties of religious function on the National Register of Historic Places in the United States Virgin Islands
Sports venues on the National Register of Historic Places
Sports venues in Puerto Rico
Sports venues in the United States Virgin Islands
Native American history of Puerto Rico